The American elm cultivar Ulmus americana 'Lewis & Clark' (trade name ) is a development from the North Dakota State University (NDSU) Research Foundation breeding programme, released in 2004 to commemorate the 200th anniversary of the eponymous expedition. The cultivar was cloned from a tree discovered in 1994 along the Wild Rice River south west of Fargo, North Dakota, where all those around it had succumbed to Dutch elm disease; the tree remains in perfect health (2008).  proved only moderately successful in the US National Elm Trial, averaging a survival rate of 62.6% overall, potentially due to environmental factors rather than susceptibility to Dutch elm disease.

 was introduced to the UK in 2008 by Hampshire & Isle of Wight Branch, Butterfly Conservation, as part of an assessment of DED-resistant cultivars as potential hosts of the endangered White-letter Hairstreak.

Description 

 is distinguished in maturity by its broad umbrella crown and dark green foliage. The clone grows moderately quickly, averaging an increase of > 1 m in height per annum when young, reaching a height of <17 m in 25 to 30 years. The leaves are < 13 cm in length by 9 cm broad, coarsely-toothed, and with a 4 mm petiole.

Pests and diseases 
Possession of an innate resistance to Dutch elm disease was suggested after inoculation with the causal fungus at the NDSU, however replication of the tests is considered too limited to be conclusive. No other specific information available, but the species as a whole is highly susceptible to Elm Yellows; it is also moderately preferred for feeding and reproduction by the adult Elm Leaf Beetle Xanthogaleruca luteola, and highly preferred for feeding by the Japanese Beetle Popillia japonica  in the United States.
U. americana is also the most susceptible of all the elms to verticillium wilt.

Cultivation 
 has been included in the National Elm Trial coordinated by Colorado State University. The tree is in commerce in the US, and was introduced to the UK from Canada by Butterfly Conservation in 2008, and thence to the Netherlands in 2010.

Etymology 
The tree is named for the Lewis and Clark Expedition of 1804.

Accessions

North America 
North Dakota State University, US. No details known.

Europe 
Great Fontley, Fareham, UK, Butterfly Conservation Elm trials plantation, Home Field. One tree planted 2008, d.b.h. 9.5 cm in 2020
Wijdemeren city council, The Netherlands, Elm collection. Two trees planted 2016 Rading 1, Loosdrecht.

Nurseries

North America 
Bylands Nurseries Ltd., Kelowna, British Columbia, Canada.
Patmore Nursery, Brandon, Manitoba, Canada.
Sester Farms, Gresham, Oregon, US.
Sun Valley Garden Centre, Eden Prairie, Minnesota, US.

References

External links 
U. americana Lewis & Clark Prairie Expedition NDSU Plant Sciences Introduction.
 National Elm Trial

American elm cultivar
Ulmus articles with images
Ulmus